Milford granite may refer to:

 Milford pink granite, a pink or grey granite from Milford, Massachusetts
 Kitledge granite, a light grey granite from Milford, New Hampshire